The  Indianapolis Colts season was the franchise's 60th season in the National Football League and the 29th in Indianapolis. The Colts earned the first selection in the 2012 NFL Draft due to a dismal 2–14 record in 2011 and used their first pick on Stanford quarterback Andrew Luck.  The season marked the first for both head coach Chuck Pagano and general manager Ryan Grigson with the franchise.

It was also the Colts' first season since 1997 without Peyton Manning on the roster as he was released by the Colts in March 2012, after having missed the previous season due to neck surgeries, and signed with the Denver Broncos during that offseason.

Offensive coordinator Bruce Arians served as interim head coach while Pagano underwent treatment for leukemia from week 5–16. Pagano returned, with his cancer in remission, during the final week of the regular season. The team went 9–3 under Arians, who won the Coach of the Year Award. The Colts earned a playoff berth, but were defeated by the eventual Super Bowl champion Baltimore Ravens in the Wild Card round.

Football Outsiders calculated the 2012 Colts were the worst team to ever go 11–5 in a season.

Personnel changes
On January 2, 2012, one day after the final game of the 2011 season, Colts owner Jim Irsay fired team Vice Chairman Bill Polian (who had been the team's general manager since 1998) and his son, team Vice-president and general manager Chris Polian. Nine days later (January 11), Ryan Grigson was named the new general manager.  Head coach Jim Caldwell was fired on January 17, 2012. Eight days later (January 25), former Baltimore Ravens' defensive coordinator Chuck Pagano agreed to becoming the Colts new head coach.

Roster changes

Draft

Notes
 During the draft, the Colts traded up five spots from the fourth-round (#97) to the third-round (#92), with the team sending a 2013 fifth-round selection to the San Francisco 49ers.
  The Colts traded their original sixth-round selection—#172 overall—to the Philadelphia Eagles in exchange for tackle Winston Justice and the Eagles' sixth round selection—#187 overall. The Colts later traded the #187 overall selection to the New York Jets in exchange for quarterback Drew Stanton and a seventh-round selection (#214 overall).
 Compensatory selections.
 Mr. Irrelevant.

Undrafted free agents
All undrafted free agents were signed just after the 2012 NFL Draft concluded on April 28.

Departures

Additions

Staff

Final roster

Schedule

Preseason

Regular season

Note: Intra-division opponents are in bold text.

Game summaries

Regular season

Week 1: at Chicago Bears

The Colts began their season on the road against the Bears.  The game was highly hyped due to the start of the career of rookie QB Andrew Luck.  The Colts drew first blood in the first quarter as Jerrell Freeman returned an interception 3 yards for a touchdown and a 7–0 lead.  However, the Bears tied the game with Michael Bush's 1-yard run to tie the game at 7–7.  In the 2nd quarter, the Bears took the lead as Brandon Marshall caught a 3-yard touchdown pass from Jay Cutler to make the score 14–7.  They then increased their lead when Robbie Gould scored a 35-yard field goal to make the score 17–7.  The Colts drew closer to shorten the lead to 3 with Donald Brown's 18-yard touchdown run to make the score 17–14.  However, with just seconds before halftime, the Bears drove down the field while Michael Bush ran in on a 1-yard touchdown for a 24–14 halftime lead.  In the 3rd quarter the Bears gained momentum once more with Matt Forte's 6-yard touchdown run for a 31–14 lead and then Robbie Gould's 26-yard field goal for a 34–14 lead.  In the fourth quarter, Luck threw his first touchdown pass of the regular season.  A 4-yard pass to Donnie Avery to shorten the lead to 34–21.  However, the Bears capitalized the victory with Cutler's 42-yard pass to Alshon Jeffery for a final score of 41–21.

With the loss, the Colts began their season 0–1.

Week 2: vs. Minnesota Vikings

After a tough loss to the Bears, the Colts returned home to take on the Vikings.  The Vikes took the lead as Blair Walsh nailed a field goal from 51 yards out for a score of 3–0.  However, the Colts made it 7–3 with Andrew Luck's 3-yard touchdown pass to Dwayne Allen.  The Vikings came within a point as Blair Walsh kicked a 29-yard field goal for a 7–6 score.  However, the Colts moved further ahead as Vinatieri scored a 26-yard field goal, followed by Andrew Luck's 30-yard touchdown pass to Reggie Wayne for leads of 10–6 and then 17–6 at halftime.  In the 3rd quarter, the Colts increased their lead when Vinatieri scored a 45-yard field goal to make the score 20–6.  However, in the fourth quarter the Vikings were able to score 2 straight touchdowns with Christian Ponder's 7-yard pass to Stephen Burton to make the score 20–13 and then a 6-yard pass to Kyle Rudolph to tie the game at 20–20.  With 8 seconds left, the Colts drove down the field and wrapped the game up with Vinatieri 53-yard field goal for a final score of 23–20.

With the win, the Colts improved to 1–1 and remain undefeated at home against the Vikings as a franchise.

Week 3: vs. Jacksonville Jaguars

After the tough home win over the Vikings, the Colts stayed home for a division rival duel against the Jaguars.  Scoring started early as the Jags drew first blood scoring a 44-yard field goal from Josh Scobee to take a 3–0 lead.  However, the Colts took the lead with Andrew Luck's 40-yard touchdown pass to T. Y. Hilton for a 7–3 lead.  The Colts increased their lead in the 2nd quarter with Andrew Luck's 4-yard touchdown pass to Mewelde Moore for a 14–3 halftime lead.  In the 3rd quarter, the Jaguars were able to fire back as Maurice Jones-Drew ran in a touchdown from 59 yards out to cut the lead to 14–10.  Followed up quickly by Scobee's 47-yard field goal to shorten the lead to a point 14–13.  In the fourth quarter, the Jags were able to take the lead with Scobee kicking a 26-yard field goal for a 16–14 lead.  The Colts however retook the lead with Vinatieri's 37-yard field goal for a 17–16 lead.  But then the Jags were able to complete the comeback attempt 11 seconds later with Blaine Gabbert's touchdown pass to Cecil Shorts III (with a failed 2-point conversion) to make the final score 22–17.

With the loss, the Colts went into their bye week at 1–2. It would also be their last loss to a division opponent at home until 2015.

Week 5: vs. Green Bay Packers

Coming off their bye week, the Colts stayed home for a duel against the Packers.  Scoring got off to an early start as John Kuhn ran for a 2-yard touchdown to take a 7–0 lead.  In the 2nd quarter, the Packers increased their lead with Aaron Rodgers's 6-yard touchdown pass to James Jones to make the score 14–0.  After this, the Colts finally got on the board with Vinatieri's 24-yard field goal to make the score 14–3.  However, the Packers pulled away as Aaron Rodgers connected with Randall Cobb for a 31-yard touchdown pass to take a 21–3 halftime lead.  After the break, the Colts began to fire back As Andrew Luck connected with Dawyne Allen on an 8-yard touchdown pass, followed by Vinatieri's 50-yard field goal and then Luck's 3-yard rushing touchdown (with a failed 2-point conversion) to shorten the lead to 21–10, 21–13, and then 21–19.  In the 4th quarter the Colts took the lead as Vinatieri kicked a 28-yard field goal for a 1-point lead 22–21.  However, the Packers again retook the lead as Rodgers found Jones again for an 8-yard touchdown pass (with a failed 2-point conversion) and led 27–22.  However, the Colts were able to capitalize the comeback victory with Luck's 4-yard touchdown pass to Reggie Wayne with the 2-point conversion successful and win the game 30–27. This game was rated #7 on the Top 20 NFL Games of 2012 on NFL.com, as Wayne's World. The Colts also improved their record to 4–0 against the Packers at home.

With the win, the Colts improved to 2–2.

Week 6: at New York Jets

After their tough home win over the Packers, the Colts traveled to take on the Jets at Metlife Stadium.  The Colts scoring took off in the first quarter with Adam Vinatieri's 20-yard field goal to take a 3–0 lead.  However, the Jets took the lead in the 2nd quarter with Mark Sanchez looking up with Stephen Hill for a 5-yard touchdown pass for a 7–3 lead.  They would later increase their lead with Shonn Greene's 10-yard run for a 14–3 lead.  However, the Colts were able to draw closer with Vinatieri's 50-yard field goal to make the score 14–6.  However, the Jets pulled away as Sanchez found Jason Hill on a 5-yard touchdown pass to make the score 21–6 at halftime.  The Jets went back to work as Shonn Greene ran for a 4-yard touchdown to make the score 28–6.  The Colts scored another field goal from Vinatieri from 47 yards out to make the score 28–9, however the Jets wrapped the game up with Shonn Greene's 2-yard touchdown run to make the final score 35–9.

With the huge loss, the Colts fell to 2–3 while rookie QB Andrew Luck would have his first career game without a single touchdown pass.

Week 7: vs. Cleveland Browns

The Colts managed to recover from the blowout loss against the Jets and improved to 3–3 with the win.

Week 8: at Tennessee Titans

With the overtime win, the Colts improved to 4–3.

Week 9: vs. Miami Dolphins

In a close match of rookie quarterbacks, Andrew Luck barely outmatched Ryan Tannehill in a close win 23–20, with the win the Colts improved to 5-3. In the fourth quarter, referee Tony Corrente unintentionally screamed out obscenities on the microphone, causing announcer Kevin Harlan to apologize to television audiences.

Week 10: at Jacksonville Jaguars

Week 11: at New England Patriots

Week 12: vs. Buffalo Bills

Week 13: at Detroit Lions

Week 14: vs. Tennessee Titans

Week 15: at Houston Texans

This was Indianapolis' last loss to a divisional opponent until 2015.

Week 16: at Kansas City Chiefs

Week 17: vs. Houston Texans

With the win, the Colts finished the season 11-5 and 2nd place in the AFC South.  Good enough for the fifth seed, first wild card in the AFC playoffs.  Also, they would improve to 11–0 against the Texans at home. The Colts also improved from their 2–14 record from 2011.

Standings

Postseason

Wild Card: at Baltimore Ravens

References

External links
 
 2012 Indianapolis Colts at ESPN
 2012 Indianapolis Colts at Pro Football Reference

Indianapolis
Indianapolis Colts seasons
Indianapolis Colts